The 2022–23 Taça de Portugal (also known as Taça de Portugal Placard for sponsorship reasons) is the 83rd edition of the Taça de Portugal, the premier knockout competition in Portuguese football.
A total of 152 clubs competed in this edition, including all teams from the top four tiers of the Portuguese football league system – excluding reserve or B teams, which are not eligible – and representatives of the fifth-tier District leagues and cups.

The competition began on 9 September 2022 with the first-round matches involving teams from the third, fourth and fifth tiers, and will be concluded on 4 June 2023 with the final at the Estádio Nacional in Oeiras. Primeira Liga side Porto are the defending champions after defeating Tondela 3–1 in the 2022 final.

The winners qualify for the 2023–24 UEFA Europa League group stage and play the 2023 Supertaça Cândido de Oliveira against the 2022–23 Primeira Liga winners.

Format

Teams 
A total of 152 teams compete in the 2022–23 edition, comprising 18 teams from the Liga Portugal Bwin (tier 1), 16 teams from the Liga Portugal SABSEG (tier 2), 21 teams from the Liga 3 (tier 3), 54 teams from the Campeonato de Portugal (tier 4) and 43 teams from the District championships and cups (tier 5).

Liga Portugal Bwin 

 Arouca
 Benfica
 Boavista
 Braga
 Casa Pia
 Chaves
 Estoril
 Famalicão
 Gil Vicente

 Marítimo
 Paços de Ferreira
 Porto
 Portimonense
 Rio Ave
 Santa Clara
 Sporting CP
 Vitória de Guimarães
 Vizela

Liga Portugal SABSEG 

 Académico de Viseu
 B-SAD
 Estrela da Amadora
 Farense
 Feirense
 Leixões
 Mafra
 Moreirense

 Nacional
 Oliveirense
 Penafiel
 Sp. Covilhã
 Tondela
 Torreense
 Trofense
 Vilafranquense

Liga 3 

Série A
 Anadia
 Canelas 2010
 Fafe
 Felgueiras
 Länk Vilaverdense
 Montalegre
 Paredes
 Sanjoanense
 São João de Ver
 Varzim

Série B
 Académica
 Alverca
 Amora
 Belenenses
 Caldas
 Fontinhas
 Moncarapachense
 Oliveira do Hospital
 Real SC
 União de Leiria
 Vitória de Setúbal

Campeonato de Portugal 

Série A
 Amarante
 Bragança
 Brito
 Dumiense
 Maria da Fonte
 Merelinense
 Monção
 Pevidém
 São Martinho
 Tirsense
 Vianense
 Vila Meã
 Vilar de Perdizes

Série B
 Alpendorada
 Beira-Mar
 Camacha
 Castro Daire
 Gondomar
 Guarda Desportiva
 Leça
 Lusitânia Lourosa
 Machico
 Rebordosa
 Resende
 Salgueiros
 Valadares Gaia

Série C
 1º Dezembro
 Alcains
 Arronches
 Benfica Castelo Branco
 Coruchense
 Loures
 Marinhense
 Mortágua
 Pêro Pinheiro
 Rio Maior
 Sertanense
 Sintrense
 União da Serra
 União de Santarém

Série D
 Angrense
 Atlético
 Esperança de Lagos
 Fabril do Barreiro
 Ferreiras
 Imortal
 Juventude Évora
 Lusitano Évora
 Olhanense
 Oriental Dragon
 Praiense
 Rabo de Peixe
 Serpa
 Vasco da Gama Vidigueira

District Championships 

Algarve FA
 Culatrense
 Silves
Angra do Heroísmo FA
 Lajense
 Lusitânia
Aveiro FA
 Águeda
 Paivense
Beja FA
 Castrense
 Moura
Braga FA
 Joane
 Santa Eulália
Bragança FA
 Rebordelo
 Vinhais

Castelo Branco FA
 Águias do Moradal
 Pedrógão de São Pedro
Coimbra FA
 Os Marialvas
 Vigor da Mocidade
Évora FA
 Atlético Reguengos
 Monte do Trigo
Guarda FA
 Mêda
 Vila Cortez
Horta FA
 Madalena
Leiria FA
 Pombal
 Portomosense

Lisbon FA
 Olivais e Moscavide
 Oriental
Madeira FA
 1º de Maio
 Ribeira Brava
Ponta Delgada FA
 São Roque
 Vasco da Gama Ponta Delgada
Portalegre FA
 Mosteirense
 Os Gavionenses
Porto FA
 Freamunde
 Vila Caíz

Santarém FA
 Fazendense
 União Tomar
Setúbal FA
 Comércio e Indústria
 Olímpico Montijo
Viana do Castelo FA
 Atlético dos Arcos
 Courense
Vila Real FA
 Mondinense
 Régua
Viseu FA
 Lusitano Vildemoinhos
 Recreativa de Lamelas

Schedule 
All draws are held at the Portuguese Football Federation (FPF) headquarters in Oeiras. Match kick-off times are in WET (UTC±0) from the third round to the semi-finals, and in WEST (UTC+1) during the rest of the competition.

First round 
A total of 118 teams representing the Liga 3, Campeonato de Portugal and the District Championships were involved in the first round draw, which was held on 11 August 2022. Thirty-four teams received a bye to the second round and the remaining teams were split into eight series according to geographical proximity. These teams were then paired inside their serie, with the first team drawn playing at home.

Byes
The following thirty-four teams received a bye to the second round:

 Real SC (3)
 Paivense (5)
 Angrense (4)
 Olivais e Moscavide (5)
 Silves (5)
 São Martinho (4)
 Castro Daire (4)
 Vila Caíz (5)
 Loures (4)

 Olímpico Montijo (5)
 Recreativa de Lamelas (5)
 Machico (4)
 Académica (3)
 Belenenses (3)
 Atlético (4)
 Caldas (3)
 Vasco da Gama Vidigueira (4)
 Coruchense (4)

 Moura (5)
 Courense (5)
 Monte do Trigo (5)
 Vitória de Setúbal (3)
 Águeda (5)
 Vigor da Mocidade (5)
 Imortal (4)
 Vasco da Gama Ponta Delgada (5)

 Anadia (3)
 Pevidém (4)
 Amora (3)
 Vilar de Perdizes (4)
 Fabril do Barreiro (4)
 Guarda Desportiva (4)
 1º de Maio (5)
 Rabo de Peixe (4)

Matches

Second round 
A total of 92 teams were involved in the second round draw, which was held on 13 September 2022.
The 16 teams from the Liga Portugal 2 joined the 42 winners from first round and the 34 teams that received a bye to the second round. All Liga Portugal 2 teams played this round as visitors.

Third round 
A total of 64 teams were involved in the third round draw, which was held on 4 October 2022. The 18 teams from the Primeira Liga joined the 46 winners from second round. All Primeira Liga teams played this round as visitors.

Fourth round 
A total of 32 teams were involved in the fourth round draw, which was held on 18 October 2022.

Fifth round 
A total of 16 teams were involved in the fifth round draw, which was held on 14 November 2022. Campeonato de Portugal's Rabo de Peixe and Beira-Mar were the lowest ranked teams in the draw.

Quarter-finals

Semi-finals

Final

Bracket

Top scorers
Players from teams still in competition are shown in bold.

Notes

References 

Taça de Portugal seasons
Portugal
Taça